No. 108 Squadron RAF was originally a squadron of the Royal Flying Corps during World War I which continued to serve with the Royal Air Force in World War II.

World War I
The unit was formed at Stonehenge or the nearby Lake Down Aerodrome in November 1917, and was equipped with Airco DH.9 bombers.

In July 1918, the squadron went to Capelle, Dunkirk, equipped with DH.9s for day-bombing operations against targets in north-west Belgium. In October 1918, it moved to Bisseghem, Belgium, and remained based there until the Armistice. During its service overseas the squadron made 59 successful bombing raids, 40 reconnaissance flights, and two photographic flights; dropped approximately 70 tons of bombs, and shot down nine enemy aircraft (a further 20 were reported shot down, but were not confirmed).

Between the wars
Disbanded in July 1919, the squadron did not reappear in the order of battle until January 1937, when it was re-formed as No. 108 (Bomber) Squadron at RAF Upper Heyford. Its initial equipment were Bristol Blenheim Mk. I bombers.

World War II

On the day before the outbreak of World War II it became a 6 Group training squadron and in April 1940, was absorbed into No. 13 Operational Training Unit at RAF Bicester. The squadron relinquished its Blenheims in February 1940 to aid Finland in the Winter War.

On 1 August 1941, No. 108 reformed at RAF Kabrit, Egypt, as a night bomber squadron. Its Wellingtons began bombing raids on 22 September, targets being ports on the Libyan coast and in Greece. In November it began to receive Consolidated Liberators and these supplemented the Wellingtons until June 1942. On 18 December 1942 the squadron was reduced to a cadre which was disbanded on 25 December 1942. On 15 March 1943 No. 108 reformed at Shandur as a night fighter squadron. Its Beaufighters flew night patrols over Egypt, Libya and Malta and were supplemented by Mosquitoes in February 1944. The latter were used for intruder missions until withdrawn in July while the Beaufighters moved back to Libya for intruder operations over Greece and the Aegean. In October 1944 the squadron moved to Greece and became involved in the attempted Communist take-over of the country in December. After taking part in attacks on rebel positions until the uprising was quelled, the squadron gave up its aircraft and sailed for Italy in March 1945, disbanding on 28 March 1945.

References

External links

108
108
Bomber squadrons of the Royal Air Force in World War II
Military units and formations established in 1917
1917 establishments in England
Military units and formations of the Royal Air Force in World War I